is a railway station on the Okinawa Urban Monorail (Yui Rail) in Naha, Okinawa Prefecture, Japan.

Lines 
Okinawa Urban Monorail

Adjacent stations

History
The station opened on 8 October 2003.

See also
 List of railway stations in Japan

External links

Railway stations in Okinawa Prefecture
Naha
Railway stations in Japan opened in 2003